Dasenahalli is a village in the southern state of Karnataka, India. It is located in the Nelamangala taluk of Bangalore Rural district.

Demographics 
Dasenahalli had population of 772 of which 390 are males while 382 are females as per report released by Census India 2011.

Geography 
The total geographical area of village is 395.13 hectares.

Bus Route from Bengaluru City 
Yeshwantapura - Darasahalli - Nelamangala

See also 

 Giriyanapalya
 Bengaluru Rural District

References

External links 

Villages in Bangalore Rural district